Donald Lacey Priestley (28 July 188730 October 1917) was an English cricketer who played for Gloucestershire County Cricket Club from 1909 to 1910. He made his debut in the County Championship against Sussex at the County Ground, Hove. In May 1910, he scored fiftyone runs against Hampshire at the County Ground, Southampton. His final first class appearance for Gloucestershire was against Worcestershire at the War Memorial Ground, Stourbridge.

He was the third son of a Tewkesbury head teacher and the younger brother of Joseph Priestley, professor of botany at the University of Leeds, and Raymond Priestley, the British geologist and Antarctic explorer. He was educated at his father's school before joining his mother's family firm as a commercial representative and wheat buyer. In May 1912, he married Edith Louie Boughton in the Wesleyan chapel at Coombe Hill, Leigh.

He was a volunteer in the 5th Battalion, Gloucestershire Regiment, and during World War I, joined the Artists Rifles regiment under the Derby Scheme. He was posted to France in November 1916 and fought in the Second Battle of Arras. He was killed by shell fire during the Second Battle of Passchendaele and is commemorated on the Memorial to the Missing at the Commonwealth War Graves Commission Tyne Cot cemetery, near Passchendaele, Belgium.

Early life and education 

Priestley was born on 28July 1887 at Tewkesbury, Gloucestershire, and baptised on 20September 1887 at the Wesleyan Methodist chapel in Northgate Street, Tewkesbury. He was the third son of eight children of Joseph Edward Priestlay, then head teacher of the Abbey House school in Tewkesbury, and Henrietta, . His mother was the second surviving daughter of Richard Rice of Tewkesbury. They had met at the Methodist chapel, and had married on 22December 1881 at Tettenhall parish church, now in the city of Wolverhampton. The Priestley family name was spelt originally as "Priestlay". However, in the early 1900s, the name changes to "Priestley" and both spellings appear on family graves in Tewkesbury Cemetery.

In 1875, Priestley's father graduated from the University of London with a second class Bachelor of Arts degree in animal physiology. He was appointed head teacher of Abbey House school following the death of his father, Joseph Priestley, on 13November 1876, and remained as head until his retirement in 1917. He moved to Bristol and joined the staff of Grace, Darbyshire, and Todd, a local firm of accountants. He died on 9December 1921, aged 67, at a nursing home in Clifton, and was interred in Canford Cemetery, Westbury-on-Trym, near Bristol. Henrietta died on 24 September 1929, aged 76, at Bishopston, Bristol.

Priestley was educated at his father's school in Tewkesbury, and along with his siblings, attended Methodist Sunday school. In 1902, he passed his preliminary Cambridge Local Examination and was awarded a school prize in mathematics. Priestley's eldest brother, Joseph, known by his family as "Bert", was professor of botany at the University of Leeds. His elder brother, Raymond, was a geologist in Robert Falcon Scott's illfated Terra Nova Expedition to the Antarctic from 1910 to 1913. His younger brother, Stanley, died on active service during World War I. Priestley had four sisters; Edith, Doris, Joyce, and Olive. Edith married Charles Seymour "Silas" Wright and Doris married Thomas Griffith "Grif" Taylor, both of whom were members of Scott's expedition. Joyce married Herbert William Merrell, who served with the Gloucestershire Regiment (known as the "Glosters") in World War I.

Cricket career 
Priestley was a good allround sportsperson. At Tewkesbury, he captained the Second XI football team, played hockey, was a member of the Tewkesbury Popular Angling Association, and in his younger days, rowed in the annual town regatta. However, his foremost sporting interest was in playing the game of cricket. He and Stanley, who was regarded as a good bowler, played for their school's First XI and Tewkesbury cricket club. Their father was secretary of the cricket club and Priestley was said to be one of the club's best players; good at batting as well as bowling and fielding. Joseph would also go on to play for the cricket team at University College, Bristol, and captain the staff team at the University of Leeds.

Priesley scored 1,141 runs in the 1907 season for Tewkesbury cricket club, and in May 1910, he scored 131 in one innings against Malvern, hitting eighteen fours and a six. In May 1909, he was selected to play for Gloucestershire County Cricket Club, making his debut in the County Championship against Sussex County Cricket Club at the County Ground in Hove. He came into the side to replace Charles Barnett, playing as an amateur in a team that consisted largely of professional players. He went on to play against Somerset, Sussex (at the Bristol County Ground), Nottinghamshire, Hampshire and Warwickshire.

In July 1910, Priestley made his final first class appearance against Worcestershire at the War Memorial Ground in Amblecote near Stourbridge. Writing in Athletic News, "Brum" remarked that Priestley had "undoubtedly the best innings" for Gloucestershire, however, he was replaced by Douglas Robinson in Gloucestershire's next match against Northamptonshire. It has been acknowledged that Priestley did not display his best form when playing for Gloucestershire, although in June 1910, in a trial game for Gloucestershire at the Bristol County Ground, he scored ninety runs in his first innings.

Personal life 

Priestley worked as a commercial representative and wheat buyer for his mother's family firm, William Rice and Company, corn millers and seed merchants at Abbey Mills, Tewkesbury. Stanley worked as a clerk at the company but he left Tewkesbury in 1912 to follow Joseph to the University of Leeds where he became a member of the Officers' Training Corps. On 22May 1912, Priestley married Edith Louie Boughton in the Wesleyan chapel at Coombe Hill, Leigh, Gloucestershire. Stanley was best man, Doris was bridesmaid, and the honeymoon was spent in Bournemouth. Edith had been a music teacher and an organist at StJohn the Baptist's church, Tredington, Stoke Orchard, and they had met through their shared interest in the Wesleyan Church and the Men's Own Brotherhood. After their marriage, they lived at Springfield, Barton Road, Tewkesbury.

Edith was the only daughter of Walter Thomas Boughton and Jane, née Cullis. Her mother was the daughter of Frederick Cullis, a builder in Gloucester, and the aunt of Winifred Cullis, professor of physiology at the University of London in 1919, and Cuthbert Edmund Cullis, then Hardinge professor of mathematics at the University of Calcutta. Her father was an outfitter at 84 Barton Street, Tewkesbury, and a former mayor of the town. During World War I, Edith played pianoforte at concerts organised to entertain wounded soldiers at the Voluntary Aid Detachment hospital at Mitton Manor, Gloucestershire. She had also volunteered at a number of YMCA huts that included Tewkesbury (her father was president of the YMCA at Tewkesbury), Park Royal camp in Harlesden, West London, and Woodcote Park near Epsom, Surrey, where there was a convalescent camp for Canadian soldiers.

War service and death 

Before World War I, Priestley was a volunteer in the Territorial Force D Company, 5th Battalion, Gloucestershire Regiment. On 7 December 1915, Priestley attested at Tewkesbury under the Derby Scheme (Group Scheme). Men who enrolled under the scheme were posted to the Army Reserve and then called up for military service at a later date. He was mobilised on 28 September 1916 and posted to the 1st/28th (County of London) Battalion, London Regiment, known as the Artists Rifles, based at Duke's Road, off Euston Road, London. On 4November 1916, Priestley left Southampton for Le Havre in Normandy, France, as part of the British Expeditionary Force (BEF), and on 9November 1916, joined his battalion at Irish Farm near Ypres, Belgium. In June 1917, the battalion joined the 63rd (Royal Naval) Division on the Western Front, and took part in the Second Battle of Arras.

At the beginning of October 1917, Priestley was appointed an unpaid lance corporal, the lowest non-commissioned officer rank. He was killed by shell fire on 30October 1917, during the Second Battle of Passchendaele, along with a large section of his platoon, while leading them through waistdeep mud towards a German position in the Ypres Salient. Edith was working at Woodcote Park when her father received the letter from Priestley's platoon officer stating that he had been killed in action. His body was never recovered but he is commemorated on panel 153 of the Memorial to the Missing at the Commonwealth War Graves Commission Tyne Cot cemetery, near Passchendaele, Belgium. His cousin, Charles Lacey Priestley, a captain in the Gloucestershire Regiment, was killed in the same battle on 11November 1917. Charles was the son of Charles William Priestley, head teacher of Richmond Lodge, a preparatory school for boys in Torquay, Devon.

There are memorials to Priestley in Tewkesbury at the abbey, the cross, the town hall, and the Methodist church. The memorial inside the town hall was displayed originally at his school. There is also a memorial bench in the abbey grounds that was restored in 2015 by the Old Theocsbrian Society, the alumni association for the Abbey House school. In March 1942, Raymond, then vice‑chancellor of the University of Birmingham, gifted money to Tewkesbury Grammar School to found two cricket prizes in memory of his brothers. The "Donald Lacey Priestley Prize" was given to the pupil with the best batting record and the "Stanley Noel Priestley Prize" was given for the best bowling average performance. Gloucestershire County Cricket Club Heritage Trust have had commissioned a memorial tablet to commemorate all eighteen firstclass Gloucestershire cricket players who were killed during the war. The tablet is located inside the museum and educational centre at the Bristol County Ground.

After Priestley's death, Edith stayed at Richmond Lodge before moving to Hoo Farm at Deerhurst, Tewkesbury, owned at the time by her father. She was granted a war widows' pension on 29April 1918, and in the following year, she moved to 25Gower Street, London, close to the Royal Academy of Dramatic Art (RADA) building and the Medical School at University College London. Edith's mother came to live with her after the death of Edith's father in 1933, and in June 1939, they left London for Gloucestershire, to stay with her brother, Herbert Cullis Boughton, at his home in Apperley near Tewkesbury. After the end of World War II, she returned to London and died on 30December 1975, aged 95, at St Mary's Hospital in Harrow Road, Paddington. She was cremated on 5January 1976 at Kensal Green Cemetery and her ashes were later interred in the cemetery grounds.

See also

Footnotes

References

Further reading

External links 
 Past head teachers of the Abbey House school at Tewkesbury, via the Old Theocsbrian Society, the alumni association of the school. The article includes a photograph of Priestley's father, Joseph Edward.
 Memorial plaque affixed to a bench in the grounds of Tewkesbury abbey. It was restored in 2015 by the Old Theocsbrian Society.
 World War I memorial at Tewkesbury Methodist Church via the Imperial War Museum.
 Priestley's entry in the Lives of the First World War via the Imperial War Museum.
 Photograph of the canteen staff of the Tewkesbury YMCA Soldiers' Club via the Tewkesbury Historical Society. Priestley's wife, Edith Louie, is pictured on the back row, fourth right.
 Woodcote Park Camp by Graham Deeprose in the January 2007 issue of Pell-Mell & Woodcote, the journal of the Royal Automobile Club, and re-published by the Epsom and Ewell Local and Family History Centre.

1887 births
1917 deaths
20th-century English people
Artists' Rifles soldiers
Cricketers from Gloucestershire
English cricketers
English Methodists
Gloucestershire cricketers
People from Tewkesbury
British military personnel killed in World War I
Sportspeople from Gloucestershire